Dorothee D. Haroske (born 1968) is a German mathematician who holds the chair for function spaces in the Institute of Mathematics of the University of Jena.

Education and career
Haroske completed her doctorate (Dr. rer. nat.) at the University of Jena in 1995, and her habilitation at Jena in 2002.

In 2018, she was given a chair for function spaces at the University of Rostock before returning to her present position in Jena.

Books
Haroske is the author of the book Envelopes and Sharp Embeddings of Function Spaces (Chapman & Hall, 2007). With Hans Triebel she also wrote Distributions, Sobolev Spaces, Elliptic Equations (EMS Textbooks in Mathematics, European Mathematical Society, 2008).

She is one of the editors of Function Spaces, Differential Operators and Nonlinear Analysis: The Hans Triebel Anniversary Volume (Springer Basel AG, 2003).

References

External links
Home page

Living people
20th-century German mathematicians
Women mathematicians
University of Jena alumni
Academic staff of the University of Rostock
Academic staff of the University of Jena
1968 births
21st-century German mathematicians